Spilarctia rhodius is a moth in the family Erebidae. It was described by Walter Rothschild in 1920. It is found on Sumatra in Indonesia.

References

Moths described in 1920
rhodius